The Cook Islands–United States Maritime Boundary Treaty is a 1980 treaty that establishes the maritime boundary between the Cook Islands and American Samoa. It resolved a number of territorial disputes between the Cook Islands and the United States.

The treaty was signed in Rarotonga on 11 June 1980. The boundary is an equidistant line between the nearest islands of the two states. The boundary is 566 nautical miles long and consists of 24 maritime straight-line segments defined by 25 individual coordinate points. The north end of the boundary forms the tripoint with Tokelau and the south end of the boundary forms the tripoint with Niue.

The treaty resolved a number of territorial disputes between the Cook Islands and the United States. First, the United States recognised the Cook Islands' sovereignty over the islands of Pukapuka, Manihiki, Rakahanga, and Penrhyn. Second, the United States implicitly demonstrated that it had abandoned its claim that Tokelau was part of American Samoa, since the boundary was set to terminate at its north end at a point at which a hypothetical equidistant boundary tripoint between the Cook Islands, American Samoa, and Tokelau would have existed. In December 1980, the United States confirmed the tripoint by agreeing to the Treaty of Tokehega with New Zealand, which formally established the Tokelau–American Samoa border.

The full name of the treaty is Treaty between the United States of America and the Cook Islands on Friendship and Delimitation of the Maritime Boundary between the United States of America and the Cook Islands. The treaty was ratified by the United States and the Cook Islands in 1983 and came into force on 8 September 1983.

See also 
Guano Islands Act

Notes

References
 Anderson, Ewan W. (2003). International Boundaries: A Geopolitical Atlas. Routledge: New York. ;  OCLC 54061586
 Charney, Jonathan I., David A. Colson, Robert W. Smith. (2005). International Maritime Boundaries, 5 vols. Hotei Publishing: Leiden. ; ; ; ; ;  OCLC 23254092

External links
Full text of treaty

1980 in American Samoa
1980 in the Cook Islands
American Samoa–Cook Islands border
Boundary treaties
Disputed territories in Oceania
Treaties of the Cook Islands
Treaties of the United States
Guano Islands Act
1980 in Oceania
June 1980 events in the United States
Treaties concluded in 1980
Treaties entered into force in 1983
Pukapuka
Manihiki
Rakahanga
Penrhyn atoll
Cook Islands–United States relations
United Nations treaties
Treaties extended to American Samoa
1980 in New Zealand law